Una comedia macabra is a 2017 Peruvian comedy horror film written and directed by Sandro Ventura. It stars Emilia Drago and Natalia Salas. The film is based on the micro-theater play of the same name, presented as part of the "Sinister Tales" proposal. It premiered on September 21, 2017 in Peruvian theaters.

Synopsis 
Ángela, a very religious and good-hearted young woman, who, faced with her boyfriend's infidelity (and to the surprise of her catechism group), is filled with fury and an uncontrollable desire for revenge. With the reluctant help of her friend Jenny, Angela will embark on the crazy and no less rugged path to celebrate a voodoo ceremony preceded by the eccentric Madame Karina.

Cast 
The actors participating in this film are:

 Emilia Drago as Ángela
 Adal Ramones as Damián
 Fiorella Rodríguez as Madame Karina
 Jessica Cediel as Lamia
 Natalia Salas as Jenny
 Alicia Mercado as Jennifer
 Manolo Rojas as Policeman

Production 
Filming for the film began on February 19, 2017.

Reception 
Una comedia macabra in an average of 3 weeks brought 50,000 viewers to the cinema.

References

External links 

 

2017 films
2017 comedy horror films
Peruvian comedy horror films
Big Bang Films films
2010s Spanish-language films
2010s Peruvian films
Films set in Peru
Films shot in Peru
Films based on plays
Films about infidelity
Films about revenge